The 2019–20 Women's Big Bash League season or WBBL|05 was the fifth season of the Women's Big Bash League (WBBL), the semi-professional women's Twenty20 domestic cricket competition in Australia. The tournament moved to a standalone calendar slot, shifting away from the men's BBL, beginning on 18 October and running to 8 December 2019.

The Sydney Sixers entered the season as "hot favourites", but they lost five consecutive games in the back-half of the tournament and missed out on qualifying for finals for the first time after captain Ellyse Perry sustained a shoulder injury. Defending champions Brisbane Heat finished the regular season on top of the ladder, earning the right to host all three playoff matches at Allan Border Field.

The Heat retained their title on 8 December 2019 when they defeated first-time finalist Adelaide Strikers, featuring Player of the Tournament Sophie Devine, by six wickets in the championship decider. Beth Mooney was named Player of the Final for the second consecutive season.

Teams 
Each 2019–20 squad featured 15 active players, with an allowance of up to five marquee signings including a maximum of three from overseas. Australian marquees were defined as players who held a national women's team contract at the time of signing on for their WBBL|05 team.

The table below lists each team's marquee players and other key details for the season.

Personnel changes 
The pre-season was noted as particularly busy for player transfers which produced some of the biggest recruiting achievements in the tournament's five-year history.

Local players 
The table below lists local player movements made ahead of the season.

Changes made during the season included:

 On 18 November 2019, Emily Smith was banned for the remainder of WBBL|05 after contravening Cricket Australia's anti-corruption policy with a social media post. Under a special exemption, Tasmanian Tigers member Emma Manix-Geeves was brought into the Hobart Hurricanes squad as a replacement.

Overseas players 
Harmanpreet Kaur and Smriti Mandhana did not re-sign for the Sydney Thunder and Hobart Hurricanes respectively on account of a conflicting national team schedule, marking the first WBBL season to not feature any Indian-born players. This fixturing clash followed a dispute between the BCCI and CA earlier in the year when Australia's top talent (such as Meg Lanning, Ellyse Perry and Alyssa Healy) were excluded from the 2019 Women's T20 Challenge—an exhibition tournament serving as a potential precursor to a future female equivalent of the Indian Premier League. ESPNcricinfo reported this breakdown was part of a wider disagreement between the two boards that revolved around the BCCI's insistence on CA honouring a touring commitment to play a men's bi-lateral ODI series in India in January 2020.

The table below lists changes to overseas player allocations made ahead of the season.

Changes made during the season included:

 On 19 November, the Sydney Sixers announced the signing of English marquee Hollie Armitage, replacing captain Ellyse Perry who would miss five games due to a shoulder injury.
 After scoring a T20I century for Sri Lanka against Australia on 29 September 2019, Chamari Atapattu stated in a post-match press conference she had not been offered a contract for the upcoming Women's Big Bash League season despite her eagerness to participate again (she had previously played for the Melbourne Renegades in WBBL|03), underlining the league's fierce competition for marquee signings. However, it was announced on 30 November that Atapattu had signed with the Renegades for their last regular season game and finals. She replaced Tammy Beaumont who—along with Danni Wyatt, Nat Sciver, Amy Jones and Lauren Winfield—would miss out on the WBBL|05 finals due to national team commitments.

Leadership 
Coaching changes made ahead of the season included:

 Ashley Noffke was appointed head coach of the Brisbane Heat, replacing Peter McGiffin.
 Trevor Griffin was appointed head coach of the Sydney Thunder, replacing Joanne Broadbent.
 Luke Williams was appointed head coach of the Adelaide Strikers, replacing Andrea McCauley.

Captaincy changes made ahead of the season included:

 Corinne Hall reassumed the captaincy of the Hobart Hurricanes, after Sasha Moloney (2–12 win–loss record) stepped into the position for a season.
 Jess Duffin was appointed captain of the Melbourne Renegades, replacing Amy Satterthwaite. Despite not playing due to maternity leave, the Renegades announced Satterthwaite would continue to contribute off-field in a specialist coaching capacity throughout WBBL|05.
 Rachael Haynes was appointed captain of the Sydney Thunder, replacing Alex Blackwell (36–22).
Elyse Villani was appointed captain of the Melbourne Stars, replacing Kristen Beams (7–12).

Captaincy changes made during the season included:

 Alex Blackwell stood in as acting captain of the Sydney Thunder for one game on 10 November, replacing Rachael Haynes who was sidelined with a foot injury.
 Molly Strano stood in as acting captain of the Melbourne Renegades for one game on 17 November, replacing Jess Duffin. It was later revealed Duffin was sidelined due to morning sickness.
 Alyssa Healy stood in as acting captain of the Sydney Sixers for five games from 20 November to 1 December, replacing Ellyse Perry who was sidelined with a shoulder injury.

Points table

Win–loss table 
Below is a summary of results for each team's fourteen regular season matches, plus finals where applicable, in chronological order. A team's opponent for any given match is listed above the margin of victory/defeat.

Fixtures
All times are local time

Week 1

Thunder batters Alex Blackwell and Phoebe Litchfield set a new WBBL record for highest fourth-wicket partnership in their pursuit of the Heat's 9/150. The unbeaten 97-run stand, which got the Thunder over the line with seven balls to spare, was noted for the 20-year age gap between the two batting partners. At 16 years and 185 days, Litchfield also set a new WBBL record as the youngest player to score a half-century.

Week 2

Week 3

Week 4

Week 5

The Renegades, requiring 28 runs off the last 12 deliveries with only three wickets in hand, pulled off a "great escape" victory against the Sixers through a last-ball six from Courtney Webb against the bowling of Marizanne Kapp. It marked the first time a WBBL team had won a match when needing more than four runs off the final legal delivery. The ramifications of the result were season-shaping as the Renegades went on to edge out the Sixers for fourth spot on the ladder, making it the first season the Sixers would fail to qualify for finals.

Week 6

The Sixers entered the match having defeated the Hurricanes in their first eleven encounters, holding a WBBL record for the longest head-to-head winning streak. With captain Ellyse Perry sidelined due to a shoulder injury, they faltered early to a score of 5/30. A resurgence, led by Marizanne Kapp's unbeaten 55 off 40 balls, helped Sydney to a total of 7/134. Hobart's chase got off to a shaky start as they found themselves down 4/22 after five overs. A healthy partnership between batters Nicola Carey and Corinne Hall came to an end in the 15th over when Hall was spectacularly caught by former Hurricanes player Erin Burns in the outfield. With 44 runs required from the final 33 deliveries, Carey went on to make 55 not out while a quickfire 29 by Chloe Tryon sealed victory for the Hurricanes with five wickets in hand and ten balls remaining. In addition to snapping their elongated head-to-head losing streak, the win set a new mark for Hobart's highest successful run chase. Belinda Vakarewa, who sliced through the Sixers' top-order, was named Player of the Match for her bowling figures of 4/19.

Week 7

Knockout phase

Semi-finals

In the first-ever semi-final encounter between the two teams, the Renegades batted first and were slow out of the blocks to be down 2/59 in the ninth over. An ensuing 80-run partnership from 58 balls between Josie Dooley and Jess Duffin ended when the latter was stumped by Beth Mooney off the bowling of Jess Jonassen. A quickfire cameo of 22 off 8 by Georgia Wareham finished the innings promisingly while Dooley, having won a championship with the Brisbane Heat in the previous season, top-scored for the Renegades with 50 not out. The Heat top-order batters of Maddy Green, Jess Jonassen and Grace Harris then "produced fireworks," collectively scoring 126 runs while only facing 79 balls. Molly Strano picked up wickets throughout the second innings, although Brisbane only required 15 runs with 27 balls remaining by the time she claimed her (and the Renegades') fourth. Despite a mini-collapse late in the chase, the Heat hauled in the target of 164 with a comfortable buffer of twelve balls to spare, knocking the Renegades out of the tournament.

Final

The Heat gained early ascendancy through quick bowler Georgia Prestwidge, who dismissed Player of the Tournament Sophie Devine for just five. A "superb" knock of 55 runs from 33 balls by Amanda-Jade Wellington helped the Strikers to recover to a competitive score of 7/161. The match swung heavily toward Brisbane's favour in the fifth over of the run chase when Sammy-Jo Johnson hit four sixes against the bowling of Devine, though Johnson would be out caught-and-bowled on the last ball of the over. When Devine returned to bowl the eleventh over of the innings, Heat batter Jess Jonassen was dropped by Wellington at extra cover. Jonassen then scored a boundary from each of the next three deliveries she faced, taking Brisbane's required scoring rate down to less than a run a ball. The Heat went on to win with six wickets in hand and eleven balls remaining, claiming their second consecutive championship. For her contribution of 56 not out, Beth Mooney was named Player of the Final.

Statistics

Highest totals

Most runs

Most wickets

Awards

Player of the tournament 
Player of the Tournament votes are awarded on a 3-2-1 basis by the two standing umpires at the conclusion of every match, meaning a player can receive a maximum of six votes per game.

Source: WBBL|05 Player of the Tournament

Team of the tournament 
Cricket Australia appointed a panel of experts to select a Team of the Tournament that recognises the standout performers of WBBL|05. The team is intended to mimic regular conditions such as a maximum of three overseas players, a realistic mix of batters and bowlers, as well as a captain and a wicket-keeper.

The members of the selection panel were cricket.com.au journalist Laura Jolly, Head of Big Bash Leagues Alistair Dobson, Australian women's cricket team head coach Matthew Mott, former Australian captain Belinda Clark, former players Lisa Sthalekar (Seven Network) and Mel Jones (Fox Cricket) and ABC commentator Alister Nicholson.

 Sophie Devine (Adelaide Strikers)
 Beth Mooney (Brisbane Heat) – wicket-keeper
 Danielle Wyatt (Melbourne Renegades)
 Meg Lanning (Perth Scorchers)
 Ellyse Perry (Sydney Sixers)
 Jess Duffin (Melbourne Renegades) – captain
 Jess Jonassen (Brisbane Heat)
 Marizanne Kapp (Sydney Sixers)
 Molly Strano (Melbourne Renegades)
 Megan Schutt (Adelaide Strikers)
 Belinda Vakarewa (Hobart Hurricanes)
 Ashley Noffke (Brisbane Heat) – coach
Source: WBBL|05 Team of the Tournament

Young gun award 
Players under 21 years of age at the start of the season are eligible for the Young Gun Award. Weekly winners are selected over the course of the season by a panel of Cricket Australia officials based on match performance, on-field and off-field attitude, and their demonstration of skill, tenacity and good sportsmanship. Each weekly winner receives a $500 Rebel gift card and the overall winner receives a $5000 cash prize, as well as access to a learning and mentor program.

The nominees for the WBBL|05 Young Gun were:
Week 1: Phoebe Litchfield (Sydney Thunder)
Week 2: Tayla Vlaeminck (Hobart Hurricanes)
Week 3: Hannah Darlington (Sydney Thunder) – winner
Week 4: Tahlia Wilson (Sydney Thunder)
Week 5: Courtney Webb (Melbourne Renegades)
Week 6: Annabel Sutherland (Melbourne Stars)
Week 7: Stella Campbell (Sydney Sixers)

Sydney Thunder medium-pacer Hannah Darlington took out the overall award on the back of a standout debut season in which she claimed 16 wickets at an average of 21.31 and economy rate of 6.82.

Most valuable players
Each team designated an award to adjudge and recognise their most outstanding contributor for the season. 

 Adelaide Strikers Most Valuable Player: Sophie Devine 
 Brisbane Heat Most Valuable Player: Jess Jonassen 
 Hobart Hurricanes Player of the Tournament: Belinda Vakarewa 
 Melbourne Renegades Player of the Season: Jess Duffin 
 Melbourne Stars Player of the Season: Lizelle Lee 
 Perth Scorchers Player of the Year: Nat Sciver 
 Sydney Sixers Player of the Tournament: Marizanne Kapp 
 Sydney Thunder Alex Blackwell Medal: Hannah Darlington

"Player of the match" tally
The table below shows the number of Player of the Match awards won by each player throughout the season. The career tally indicates the number of awards won by a player throughout her entire time in the league at the conclusion of the season, including awards won while previously playing for a different WBBL team.

Audience
A total of 23 matches are to be televised on free-to-air by the Seven Network, and simulcast on Fox Cricket in the fifth season of the Women's Big Bash. The remaining 36 matches will be live streamed on the Cricket Australia website. All 59 matches are available to watch live or on demand via the streaming service Kayo Sports.

Below are the television ratings for every game that was broadcast on television during the season.

See also
2019–20 Big Bash League season

References

Further reading

Notes

External links
 Official fixtures
 Series home at ESPN Cricinfo

 
2019–20 Women's Big Bash League season by team
Women's Big Bash League seasons
!
Women's Big Bash League